Sorting nexin 10 is a protein that in humans is encoded by the SNX10 gene.

Function

This gene encodes a member of the sorting nexin family. Members of this family contain a phox (PX) domain, which is a phosphoinositide binding domain, and are involved in intracellular trafficking. This protein does not contain a coiled coil region, like some family members. This gene may play a role in regulating endosome homeostasis. Alternative splicing results in multiple transcript variants.

References

Further reading